Kusumgram is a large and famous village in Manteswar CD block in Kalna subdivision of Purba Bardhaman district in the state of West Bengal, India.It is a Muslim majority village with 80 percent Muslims.

Demographics
As per the 2011 Census of India Kusumgram had a total population of 11,707, of which 5,972 (51%) were males and 5,735 (49%) were females. Population below 6 years was 1,572. The total number of literates in Kusumgram was 7,470 (73.70% of the population over 6 years).

Transport
State Highway 8 running from Santaldi (in Purulia district) to Majhdia (in Nadia district) and State Highway 15 running from Dainhat (in Purba Bardhaman district) to Gadiara (in Howrah district) cross at Kusumgram.

Education
Kusumgram Tyeba Institution, established in 1923, is a Bengali-medium co-educational, higher secondary school.

Several private primary and secondary residential and day-boarding schools such as Children Academy were also founded.

References

Villages in Purba Bardhaman district